The women's 100 metres at the 2011 Asian Athletics Championships was held at the Kobe Universiade Memorial Stadium on 7–8 July.

Medalists

Results

Heats
First 2 in each heat (Q) and 2 best performers (q) advanced to the final.

Wind:Heat 1: +0.3 m/s, Heat 2: –0.1 m/s, Heat 3: +1.0 m/s

Final
Wind: +1.9 m/s

References
Results

100 metres
100 metres at the Asian Athletics Championships
2011 in women's athletics